Francis or Frances Palmer may refer to:
Francis W. Palmer (1827–1907), politician and publisher from New York, Iowa and Illinois
Francis Noel Palmer (1887–1961), British politician
Francis Palmer (rugby union) (1877–1951), rugby union player who represented England
Francis Palmer of Francis F. Palmer House
Francis Palmer (priest) from Ridley Hall, Cambridge
Frances Palmer (artist), American ceramicist 
Frances Flora Bond Palmer, English artist

See also
Francis Palmer Smith (1886–1971), architect active in Atlanta
Francis Palmer Selleck (1895–1976), Australian businessman and politician
Frank Palmer (disambiguation)